Tenkasi Pandyas were the Pandya kings from Sadaavarman Parakrama Pandya to his successors who ruled with Tenkasi as their capital. With the invasion of the Sultanates, Vijayanagaras, and Nayakars from the fourteenth century onwards, the Pandyas lost their traditional capital of Madurai and shifted to cities like Tenkasi and Tirunelveli. Tenkasi was the last capital of the Pandyas. All the Pandyas from Sadaavarman Parakrama Pandya and his next generations were crowned in the Adheenam Mutt in Kasi Viswanathar temple. During the same period, some Pandyas ruled with Tirunelveli as their capital. Kayatharu, Vadakkuvalliyur, and Ukkirankottai are some of their major cities. Inscriptions on them are found in Tenkasi's Kasi Viswanathar temple, Brahmadesam, Cheranmadevi, Ambasamudram, Kalakkad and Pudukkottai. The last Pandyan king to be known in the history of the Pandyas was Kolakonda, who was also among the Tenkasi Pandyas.

All the Pandyas of the Varagunarama Pandya period were under the Vijayanagara Empire and paid them tribute. However, other sources invariably mention that though the Madurai Nayakas were in-charge of Madurai, from time to time, they were opposed by and had skirmishes with the Tenkasi Pandyans, who are also said to have had intermittent control of Madurai. The Tenkasi Pandyas also had imperial ambitions, fought some wars, conquered territories outside their terrain. This is proven by the fact that the last Tenkasi Pandyan king bore the title "Kollamkondan", which means the one who conquered Kollam in Malayalam country.

Pandyas losing Madurai 
Although the Vijayanagara Empire and the Nayaks ruled Madurai after the 14th century, they were occasionally opposed by the Pandyas. Sometimes they have ruled Madurai. Prominent among them were Saadavarman Vikrama Pandya (1401 – 1422 AD) and his son, Arikesari Parakrama Pandya. They had built 32 forts around Madurai. Later, when Vishwanatha Nayakkar became the Madurai Mandalasuvaran, he feared of Pandya resurgence in Madurai. He divided Madurai into 72 districts, including 16 districts of those closest to the Pandyas. He gave them positions and made them separate from the Pandyas. This made Pandyas to lose Madurai forever.

Tenkasi's origin 

Shenbagapozhil in Tamil means "champak tree-lined rainforest". In the fifteenth century, Lord Shiva is said to have had appeared in the dream of King Parakrama Pandya, who ruled the Shenbagapozhil area. In that dream, he was said that a lingam worshiped by the Pandya's ancestors was in the Shenbaga forest. He was said that ants could be found crawling out of their fort and if they followed the ants, the lingam could be found. He was also told by Shiva to construct a temple there. The reason is the order from Shiva, "Shiva devotees in the south die before reaching Kashi on their way to Varanasi in the north. So for them to get my grace, build a city equaling that of Varanasi in the south". Obeying his words, King Parakrama Pandya built the Tenkasi gopuram for his ancestor-worshiped lingam. The word Tenkasi translates to "South Kashi" ("ten" or "then" meaning south in Tamil). The town was called the Tenkasi after the temple.

Other names 
Tenkasi was known by 16 names before the reign of Sadaavarman Parakrama Pandya. They were

 Sachhithanapuram
 Muttuthantavanallur
 Anantakkuthanur
 Saivamuthur
 Tenpuliyur
 Kuyinkudi
 Sittharvasam
 Senpagapozhil
 Sivamavoor
 Sathamaatharoor
 Sithiramoolathanam
 Mayilaikudi
 Palalinkapaadi
 Vasanthakudi
 Kosigai
 Sitharpuri

Cityscape 
The Pandya city of Tenkasi was centered around the Kasi Viswanathar temple. There were square-shaped streets in succession around the temple. The Tenkasi Pandyas were based on a fortress known as Ukkirankottai.

List of Tenkasi Pandya kings 

List of Pandyas who ruled with Tenkasi as the capital.

Proofs

Historic text 
Pandya Kulodayam is a Pandya history book written by Mandalakavi (zonal poet) of the Tenkasi Pandya period. The information it contained were:

 The first Pandya king to be crowned with Tenkasi as the capital was the Sadaavarman Parakrama Pandya.
 All the Pandya kings after him were crowned in the Tenkasi temple. They were inscribed in the temple's inscriptions.
 The last Pandya king, King Kolakkondan, was killed in approximately AD 1615.

Numismatics 
Although the Pandya kings who ruled Tenkasi ruled only marginal lands, they had issued coins in their name. The coins with the name of King Sadayarvarman Kulasekara Pandya II's son Aagavarman, were found.

Art

Notable temples

Temple's specialty

Vayuvasal (Sadaavarman Parakrama Pandya entrance) 

 The temple's gopuram is known as Vayuvasal (Gateway of the air). The breeze from Vaigai river comes through this gateway. This makes it difficult to enter in the Tamil month of Ādi. Outside of the Bala Subramainya temple, there are musical pillars.

Single-stone statues 

Some of the sculptural masterpieces of Tamil Nadu can be seen in the Thiruoolaka Mandapam at the Swami sannathi. There are 16 statues in the hall.

 Agni Veerapathirar
 Rathidevi
 Maha Thandavam
 Urthuva Thandavam
 Kalidevi
 Mahavishnu
 Manmathan
 Veerapathirar
 Paavai
 Paavai
 Tharman
 Beeman
 Arjunan
 Nakulan
 Sahadevan
 Karnan

The above statues are all sculpted out of single stone with subtle workmanship by the Pandya-era sculptors.

Tunnels 
The entrance to the tunnel is still visible in the big temple. It is said to have four tunnels.

 The Avur people still say that the tunnel to the east is going to Vindhankottai in Sundarapandiapuram.
 Another route is said to pass through the Kulasekara Nathar Temple.

Thirumalapuram Paintings 
There is a cave temple on the Thirumalapuram hill near Tenkasi. It is on the way to Serndamaram village near Kadayanallur. The temple has paintings of the Pandya period. The first to discover these paintings was scholar Duprai. These colour cave temple paintings exemplify the art of the Pandya period.

Literature 
Tenkasi Pandyas had also contributed to Tamil literature.

Apart from these, a historical book called Pandya Kulodayam was also written by Mandalakavi during the Tenkasi Pandyas period.

References 

Pandyan dynasty
Pandyan kings
Tamil history
Tenkasi district